Argumentation theory, or argumentation, is the interdisciplinary study of how conclusions can be supported or undermined by premises through logical reasoning. With historical origins in logic, dialectic, and rhetoric, argumentation theory, includes the arts and sciences of civil debate, dialogue, conversation, and persuasion. It studies rules of inference, logic, and procedural rules in both artificial and real-world settings.

Argumentation includes various forms of dialogue such as deliberation and negotiation which are concerned with collaborative decision-making procedures. It also encompasses eristic dialog, the branch of social debate in which victory over an opponent is the primary goal, and didactic dialogue used for teaching. This discipline also studies the means by which people can express and rationally resolve or at least manage their disagreements.

Argumentation is a daily occurrence, such as in public debate, science, and law. For example in law, in courts by the judge, the parties and the prosecutor, in presenting and testing the validity of evidences. Also, argumentation scholars study the post hoc rationalizations by which organizational actors try to justify decisions they have made irrationally.

Argumentation is one of four rhetorical modes (also known as modes of discourse), along with exposition, description, and narration.

Key components of argumentation 
Some key components of argumentation are:
 Understanding and identifying arguments, either explicit or implied, and the goals of the participants in the different types of dialogue.
 Identifying the premises from which conclusions are derived.
 Establishing the "burden of proof" – determining who made the initial claim and is thus responsible for providing evidence why his/her position merits acceptance.
 For the one carrying the "burden of proof", the advocate, to marshal evidence for his/her position in order to convince or force the opponent's acceptance.  The method by which this is accomplished is producing valid, sound, and cogent arguments, devoid of weaknesses, and not easily attacked.
 In a debate, fulfillment of the burden of proof creates a burden of rejoinder. One must try to identify faulty reasoning in the opponent's argument, to attack the reasons/premises of the argument, to provide counterexamples if possible, to identify any fallacies, and to show why a valid conclusion cannot be derived from the reasons provided for his/her argument.

For example, consider the following exchange, illustrated by the No true Scotsman fallacy:

 Argument: "No Scotsman puts sugar on his porridge."
 Reply: "But my friend Angus likes sugar with his porridge."
 Rebuttal: "Ah yes, but no true Scotsman puts sugar on his porridge."

In this dialogue, the proposer first offers a premise, the premise is challenged by the interlocutor, and finally the proposer offers a modification of the premise. This exchange could be part of a larger discussion, for example a murder trial, in which the defendant is a Scotsman, and it had been established earlier that the murderer was eating sugared porridge when he or she committed the murder.

Internal structure of arguments 
Typically an argument has an internal structure, comprising the following:
 a set of assumptions or premises,
 a method of reasoning or deduction, and
 a conclusion or point.

An argument has one or more premises and one conclusion.

Often classical logic is used as the method of reasoning so that the conclusion follows logically from the assumptions or support. One challenge is that if the set of assumptions is inconsistent then anything can follow logically from inconsistency. Therefore, it is common to insist that the set of assumptions be consistent. It is also good practice to require the set of assumptions to be the minimal set, with respect to set inclusion, necessary to infer the consequent.  Such arguments are called MINCON arguments, short for minimal consistent.  Such argumentation has been applied to the fields of law and medicine.

A non-classical approach to argumentation investigates abstract arguments, where 'argument' is considered a primitive term, so no internal structure of arguments is taken into account.

Types of dialogue
In its most common form, argumentation involves an individual and an interlocutor or opponent engaged in dialogue, each contending differing positions and trying to persuade each other, but there are various types of dialogue:
 Persuasion dialogue aims to resolve conflicting points of view of different positions.
 Negotiation aims to resolve conflicts of interests by cooperation and dealmaking.
 Inquiry aims to resolve general ignorance by the growth of knowledge.
 Deliberation aims to resolve a need to take action by reaching a decision.
 Information seeking aims to reduce one party's ignorance by requesting information from another party that is in a position to know something.
 Eristic aims to resolve a situation of antagonism through verbal fighting.

Argumentation and the grounds of knowledge
Argumentation theory had its origins in foundationalism, a theory of knowledge (epistemology) in the field of philosophy. It sought to find the grounds for claims in the forms (logic) and materials (factual laws) of a universal system of knowledge. The dialectical method was made famous by Plato and his use of Socrates critically questioning various characters and historical figures. But argument scholars gradually rejected Aristotle's systematic philosophy and the idealism in Plato and Kant. They questioned and ultimately discarded the idea that argument premises take their soundness from formal philosophical systems. The field thus broadened.

One of the original contributors to this trend was the philosopher Chaïm Perelman, who together with Lucie Olbrechts-Tyteca introduced the French term la nouvelle rhetorique in 1958 to describe an approach to argument which is not reduced to application of formal rules of inference. Perelman's view of argumentation is much closer to a juridical one, in which rules for presenting evidence and rebuttals play an important role.

Karl R. Wallace's seminal essay, "The Substance of Rhetoric: Good Reasons" in the Quarterly Journal of Speech (1963) 44, led many scholars to study "marketplace argumentation" – the ordinary arguments of ordinary people. The seminal essay on marketplace argumentation is Ray Lynn Anderson's and C. David Mortensen's "Logic and Marketplace Argumentation" Quarterly Journal of Speech 53 (1967): 143–150. This line of thinking led to a natural alliance with late developments in the sociology of knowledge. Some scholars drew connections with recent developments in philosophy, namely the pragmatism of John Dewey and Richard Rorty. Rorty has called this shift in emphasis "the linguistic turn".

In this new hybrid approach argumentation is used with or without empirical evidence to establish convincing conclusions about issues which are moral, scientific, epistemic, or of a nature in which science alone cannot answer. Out of pragmatism and many intellectual developments in the humanities and social sciences, "non-philosophical" argumentation theories grew which located the formal and material grounds of arguments in particular intellectual fields.  These theories include informal logic, social epistemology, ethnomethodology, speech acts, the sociology of knowledge, the sociology of science, and social psychology. These new theories are not non-logical or anti-logical. They find logical coherence in most communities of discourse. These theories are thus often labeled "sociological" in that they focus on the social grounds of knowledge.

Approaches to argumentation in communication and informal logic
In general, the label "argumentation" is used by communication scholars such as (to name only a few) Wayne E. Brockriede, Douglas Ehninger, Joseph W. Wenzel, Richard Rieke, Gordon Mitchell, Carol Winkler, Eric Gander, Dennis S. Gouran, Daniel J. O'Keefe, Mark Aakhus, Bruce Gronbeck, James Klumpp, G. Thomas Goodnight, Robin Rowland, Dale Hample, C. Scott Jacobs, Sally Jackson, David Zarefsky, and Charles Arthur Willard, while the term "informal logic" is preferred by philosophers, stemming from University of Windsor philosophers Ralph H. Johnson and J. Anthony Blair. Harald Wohlrapp developed a criterion for validness (Geltung, Gültigkeit) as freedom of objections.

Trudy Govier, Douglas N. Walton, Michael Gilbert, Harvey Seigal, Michael Scriven, and John Woods (to name only a few) are other prominent authors in this tradition. Over the past thirty years, however, scholars from several disciplines have co-mingled at international conferences such as that hosted by the University of Amsterdam (the Netherlands) and the International Society for the Study of Argumentation (ISSA). Other international conferences are the biannual conference held at Alta, Utah sponsored by the (US) National Communication Association and American Forensics Association and conferences sponsored by the Ontario Society for the Study of Argumentation (OSSA).

Some scholars (such as Ralph H. Johnson) construe the term "argument" narrowly, as exclusively written discourse or even discourse in which all premises are explicit. Others (such as Michael Gilbert) construe the term "argument" broadly, to include spoken and even nonverbal discourse, for instance the degree to which a war memorial or propaganda poster can be said to argue or "make arguments". The philosopher Stephen Toulmin has said that an argument is a claim on our attention and belief, a view that would seem to authorize treating, say, propaganda posters as arguments. The dispute between broad and narrow theorists is of long standing and is unlikely to be settled. The views of the majority of argumentation theorists and analysts fall somewhere between these two extremes.

Kinds of argumentation

Conversational argumentation

The study of naturally occurring conversation arose from the field of sociolinguistics. It is usually called conversation analysis (CA). Inspired by ethnomethodology, it was developed in the late 1960s and early 1970s principally by the sociologist Harvey Sacks and, among others, his close associates Emanuel Schegloff and Gail Jefferson. Sacks died early in his career, but his work was championed by others in his field, and CA has now become an established force in sociology, anthropology, linguistics, speech-communication and psychology. It is particularly influential in interactional sociolinguistics, discourse analysis and discursive psychology, as well as being a coherent discipline in its own right. Recently CA techniques of sequential analysis have been employed by phoneticians to explore the fine phonetic details of speech.

Empirical studies and theoretical formulations by Sally Jackson and Scott Jacobs, and several generations of their students, have described argumentation as a form of managing conversational disagreement within communication contexts and systems that naturally prefer agreement.

Mathematical argumentation

The basis of mathematical truth has been the subject of long debate. Frege in particular sought to demonstrate (see Gottlob Frege, The Foundations of Arithmetic, 1884, and Begriffsschrift, 1879) that arithmetical truths can be derived from purely logical axioms and therefore are, in the end, logical truths. The project was developed by Russell and Whitehead in their Principia Mathematica. If an argument can be cast in the form of sentences in symbolic logic, then it can be tested by the application of accepted proof procedures. This was carried out for arithmetic using Peano axioms, and the foundation most commonly used for most modern mathematics is Zermelo-Fraenkel set theory, with or without the Axiom of Choice. Be that as it may, an argument in mathematics, as in any other discipline, can be considered valid only if it can be shown that it cannot have true premises and a false conclusion.

Scientific argumentation

Perhaps the most radical statement of the social grounds of scientific knowledge appears in Alan G.Gross's The Rhetoric of Science (Cambridge: Harvard University Press, 1990). Gross holds that science is rhetorical "without remainder", meaning that scientific knowledge itself cannot be seen as an idealized ground of knowledge. Scientific knowledge is produced rhetorically, meaning that it has special epistemic authority only insofar as its communal methods of verification are trustworthy. This thinking represents an almost complete rejection of the foundationalism on which argumentation was first based.

Interpretive argumentation

Interpretive argumentation is a dialogical process in which participants explore and/or resolve interpretations often of a text of any medium containing significant ambiguity in meaning.

Interpretive argumentation is pertinent to the humanities, hermeneutics, literary theory, linguistics, semantics, pragmatics, semiotics, analytic philosophy and aesthetics.  Topics in conceptual interpretation include aesthetic, judicial, logical and religious interpretation.  Topics in scientific interpretation include scientific modeling.

Legal argumentation

By lawyers

Legal arguments are spoken presentations to a judge or appellate court by a lawyer, or parties when representing themselves of the legal reasons why they should prevail. Oral argument at the appellate level accompanies written briefs, which also advance the argument of each party in the legal dispute. A closing argument, or summation, is the concluding statement of each party's counsel reiterating the important arguments for the trier of fact, often the jury, in a court case. A closing argument occurs after the presentation of evidence.

By judges

A judicial opinion or legal opinion is in certain jurisdictions a written explanation by a judge or group of judges that accompanies an order or ruling in a case, laying out the rationale (justification) and legal principles for the ruling. It cites the decision reached to resolve the dispute. A judicial opinion usually includes the reasons behind the decision. Where there are three or more judges, it may take the form of a majority opinion, minority opinion or a concurring opinion.

Political argumentation

Political arguments are used by academics, media pundits, candidates for political office and government officials. Political arguments are also used by citizens in ordinary interactions to comment about and understand political events. The rationality of the public is a major question in this line of research. Political scientist Samuel L. Popkin coined the expression "low information voters" to describe most voters who know very little about politics or the world in general.

In practice, a "low information voter" may not be aware of legislation that their representative has sponsored in Congress.  A low-information voter may base their ballot box decision on a media sound-bite, or a flier received in the mail.  It is possible for a media sound-bite or campaign flier to present a political position for the incumbent candidate that completely contradicts the legislative action taken in the Capitol on behalf of the constituents.  It may only take a small percentage of the overall voting group who base their decision on the inaccurate information to form a voter bloc large enough to swing an overall election result.  When this happens, the constituency at large may have been duped or fooled.  Nevertheless, the election result is legal and confirmed.  Savvy Political consultants will take advantage of low-information voters and sway their votes with disinformation and fake news because it can be easier and sufficiently effective.  Fact checkers have come about in recent years to help counter the effects of such campaign tactics.

Psychological aspects
Psychology has long studied the non-logical aspects of argumentation.  For example, studies have shown that simple repetition of an idea is often a more effective method of argumentation than appeals to reason.  Propaganda often utilizes repetition. "Repeat a lie often enough and it becomes the truth" is a law of propaganda often attributed to the Nazi politician Joseph Goebbels. Nazi rhetoric has been studied extensively as, inter alia, a repetition campaign.

Empirical studies of communicator credibility and attractiveness, sometimes labeled charisma, have also been tied closely to empirically-occurring arguments. Such studies bring argumentation within the ambit of persuasion theory and practice.

Some psychologists such as William J. McGuire believe that the syllogism is the basic unit of human reasoning. They have produced a large body of empirical work around McGuire's famous title "A Syllogistic Analysis of Cognitive Relationships". A central line of this way of thinking is that logic is contaminated by psychological variables such as "wishful thinking", in which subjects confound the likelihood of predictions with the desirability of the predictions. People hear what they want to hear and see what they expect to see. If planners want something to happen they see it as likely to happen. If they hope something will not happen, they see it as unlikely to happen. Thus smokers think that they personally will avoid cancer, promiscuous people practice unsafe sex, and teenagers drive recklessly.

Theories

Argument fields
Stephen Toulmin and Charles Arthur Willard have championed the idea of argument fields, the former drawing upon Ludwig Wittgenstein's notion of language games, (Sprachspiel) the latter drawing from communication and argumentation theory, sociology, political science, and social epistemology. For Toulmin, the term "field" designates discourses within which arguments and factual claims are grounded.  For Willard, the term "field" is interchangeable with "community", "audience", or "readership". Similarly, G. Thomas Goodnight has studied "spheres" of argument and sparked a large literature created by younger scholars responding to or using his ideas. The general tenor of these field theories is that the premises of arguments take their meaning from social communities.

Stephen E. Toulmin's contributions
The most influential theorist has been Stephen Toulmin, the Cambridge educated philosopher and educator, best known for his Toulmin model of argument. What follows below is a sketch of his ideas.

An alternative to absolutism and relativism

Toulmin model of argument

The evolution of knowledge

Pragma-dialectics

Scholars at the University of Amsterdam in the Netherlands have pioneered a rigorous modern version of dialectic under the name pragma-dialectics. The intuitive idea is to formulate clear-cut rules that, if followed, will yield reasonable discussion and sound conclusions. Frans H. van Eemeren, the late Rob Grootendorst, and many of their students and co-authors have produced a large body of work expounding this idea.

The dialectical conception of reasonableness is given by ten rules for critical discussion, all being instrumental for achieving a resolution of the difference of opinion (from Van Eemeren, Grootendorst, & Snoeck Henkemans, 2002, p. 182-183). The theory postulates this as an ideal model, and not something one expects to find as an empirical fact. The model can however serve as an important heuristic and critical tool for testing how reality approximates this ideal and point to where discourse goes wrong, that is, when the rules are violated. Any such violation will constitute a fallacy. Albeit not primarily focused on fallacies, pragma-dialectics provides a systematic approach to deal with them in a coherent way.

Van Eemeren and Grootendorst identified four stages of argumentative dialogue. These stages can be regarded as an argument protocol. In a somewhat loose interpretation, the stages are as follows:

 Confrontation stage: Presentation of the difference of opinion, such as a debate question or a political disagreement.
 Opening stage: Agreement on material and procedural starting points, the mutually acceptable common ground of facts and beliefs, and the rules to be followed during the discussion (such as, how evidence is to be presented, and determination of closing conditions).
 Argumentation stage: Presentation of reasons for and against the standpoint(s) at issue, through application of logical and common-sense principles according to the agreed-upon rules
 Concluding stage: Determining whether the standpoint has withstood reasonable criticism, and accepting it is justified. This occurs when the termination conditions are met (Among these could be, for example, a time limitation or the determination of an arbiter.)

Van Eemeren and Grootendorst provide a detailed list of rules that must be applied at each stage of the protocol. Moreover, in the account of argumentation given by these authors, there are specified roles of protagonist and antagonist in the protocol which are determined by the conditions which set up the need for argument.

Walton's logical argumentation method

Douglas N. Walton developed a distinctive philosophical theory of logical argumentation built around a set of practical methods to help a user identify, analyze and evaluate arguments in everyday conversational discourse and in more structured areas such as debate, law and scientific fields. There are four main components: argumentation schemes, dialogue structures, argument mapping tools, and formal argumentation systems. The method uses the notion of commitment in dialogue as the fundamental tool for the analysis and evaluation of argumentation rather than the notion of belief. Commitments are statements that the agent has expressed or formulated, and has pledged to carry out, or has publicly asserted. According to the commitment model, agents interact with each other in a dialogue in which each takes its turn to contribute speech acts. The dialogue framework uses critical questioning as a way of testing plausible explanations and finding weak points in an argument that raise doubt concerning the acceptability of the argument.

Walton's logical argumentation model took a view of proof and justification different from analytic philosophy's dominant epistemology, which was based on a justified true belief framework. In the logical argumentation approach, knowledge is seen as form of belief commitment firmly fixed by an argumentation procedure that tests the evidence on both sides, and uses standards of proof to determine whether a proposition qualifies as knowledge. In this evidence-based approach, knowledge must be seen as defeasible.

Artificial intelligence 

Efforts have been made within the field of artificial intelligence to perform and analyze the act of argumentation with computers.  Argumentation has been used to provide a proof-theoretic semantics for non-monotonic logic, starting with the influential work of Dung (1995). Computational argumentation systems have found particular application in domains where formal logic and classical decision theory are unable to capture the richness of reasoning, domains such as law and medicine. In Elements of Argumentation, Philippe Besnard and Anthony Hunter show how classical logic-based techniques can be used to capture key elements of practical argumentation.

Within computer science, the ArgMAS workshop series (Argumentation in Multi-Agent Systems), the CMNA workshop series, and now the COMMA Conference, are regular annual events attracting participants from every continent. The journal Argument & Computation is dedicated to exploring the intersection between argumentation and computer science. ArgMining is a workshop series dedicated specifically to the related argument mining task.

See also

 Argument
 Argumentum a fortiori
 Criticism
 Critical thinking
 Defeasible reasoning
 Dialectic
 Discourse ethics
 Essentially contested concept
 Forensics
 Legal theory
 Logic and dialectic
 Logic of argumentation
 Logical reasoning
 Negotiation theory
 Pars destruens and pars construens
 Public sphere
 Rationality
 Rhetoric
 Rogerian argument
 Social engineering (political science)
 Social psychology
 Sophistry
 Source criticism
 Straight and Crooked Thinking

References

Further reading 

 J. Robert Cox and Charles Arthur Willard, eds. (1982). Advances in Argumentation Theory and Research.
 
 Bondarenko, A., Dung, P. M., Kowalski, R., and Toni, F. (1997). "An abstract, argumentation-theoretic approach to default reasoning", Artificial Intelligence 93(1-2), 63-101.
 Dung, P. M., Kowalski, R., and Toni, F. (2006). "Dialectic proof procedures for assumption-based, admissible argumentation." Artificial Intelligence. 170(2), 114-159.
 Frans van Eemeren, Rob Grootendorst, Sally Jackson, and Scott Jacobs (1993). Reconstructing Argumentative Discourse
 Frans van Eemeren & Rob Grootendorst (2004). A Systematic Theory of Argumentation: The Pragma-Dialectical Approach.
 Frans van Eemeren, Bart Garssen, Erik C. W. Krabbe, A. Francisca Snoeck Henkemans, Bart Verheij, & Jean H. M. Wagemans (2014). Handbook of Argumentation Theory (Revised edition). New York: Springer.
 Richard H. Gaskins (1993). Burdens of Proof in Modern Discourse. Yale University Press.
 Michael A. Gilbert (1997). Coalescent Argumentation.
 Trudy Govier (1987). Problems in Argument Analysis and Evaluation. Dordrecht, Holland; Providence, RI: Foris Publications.
 Trudy Govier (2014). A Practical Study of Argument, 7th ed. Australia; Boston, MA: Wadsworth/Cengage Learning. (First edition published 1985.)
 Dale Hample. (1979). "Predicting belief and belief change using a cognitive theory of argument and evidence." Communication Monographs. 46, 142-146.
 Dale Hample. (1978). "Are attitudes arguable?" Journal of Value Inquiry. 12, 311-312.
 Dale Hample. (1978). "Predicting immediate belief change and adherence to argument claims." Communication Monographs, 45, 219-228.
 Dale Hample & Judy Hample. (1978). "Evidence credibility." Debate Issues. 12, 4-5.
 Dale Hample. (1977). "Testing a model of value argument and evidence." Communication Monographs. 14, 106-120.
 Dale Hample. (1977). "The Toulmin model and the syllogism." Journal of the American Forensic Association. 14, 1-9.
 Sally Jackson and Scott Jacobs, "Structure of Conversational Argument: Pragmatic Bases for the Enthymeme." The Quarterly Journal of Speech. LXVI, 251-265.
 Ralph H. Johnson. Manifest Rationality: A Pragmatic Theory of Argument. Lawrence Erlbaum, 2000.
 Ralph H. Johnson. (1996). The Rise of Informal Logic. Newport News, VA: Vale Press
 Ralph H. Johnson. (1999). The Relation Between Formal and Informal Logic. Argumentation, 13(3) 265-74.
 Ralph H. Johnson. & Blair, J. Anthony. (2006). Logical Self-Defense.First published, McGraw Hill Ryerson, Toronto, ON, 1997, 1983, 1993. Reprinted, New York: Idebate Press.
 Ralph H. Johnson. & Blair, J. Anthony. (1987). The current state of informal logic. Informal Logic 9, 147-51.
 Ralph H. Johnson. & Blair, J. Anthony. (1996). Informal logic and critical thinking. In F. van Eemeren, R. Grootendorst, & F. Snoeck Henkemans (Eds.), Fundamentals of Argumentation Theory. (pp. 383–86). Mahwah, NJ: Lawrence Erlbaum Associates
 Ralph H. Johnson, Ralph. H. & Blair, J. Anthony. (2000). "Informal logic: An overview." Informal Logic. 20(2): 93-99.
 Ralph H. Johnson, Ralph. H. & Blair, J. Anthony. (2002). Informal logic and the reconfiguration of logic. In D. Gabbay, R. H. Johnson, H.-J. Ohlbach and J. Woods (Eds.). Handbook of the Logic of Argument and Inference: The Turn Towards the Practical. (pp. 339–396). Elsevier: North Holland.
 Chaïm Perelman and Lucie Olbrechts-Tyteca (1970). The New Rhetoric, Notre Dame.
 Stephen Toulmin (1958). The Uses of Argument.
 Stephen Toulmin (1964). The Place of Reason in Ethics.
 Douglas N. Walton (1990). Practical Reasoning: Goal-Driven, Knowledge-Based, Action-Guiding Argumentation. Savage, MD: Rowman & Littlefield.
 Douglas N. Walton (1992). The Place of Emotion in Argument. University Park, PA: Pennsylvania State University Press.
 Douglas N. Walton (1996). Argument Structure: A Pragmatic Theory. Toronto: University of Toronto Press.
 Douglas N. Walton (2006). Fundamentals of Critical Argumentation. New York: Cambridge University Press.
 Douglas N. Walton (2013). Methods of Argumentation. New York: Cambridge University Press.
 Douglas N. Walton (2016). Argument Evaluation and Evidence. Cham: Springer
 Joseph W. Wenzel (1990). Three perspectives on argumentation. In R Trapp and J Scheutz, (Eds.), Perspectives on argumentation: Essays in honour of Wayne Brockreide (9-26). Prospect Heights, IL: Waveland Press.
 John Woods. (1980). What Is informal logic? In J.A. Blair & R. H. Johnson (Eds.), Informal Logic: The First International Symposium .(pp. 57–68). Point Reyes, CA: Edgepress.
 John Woods. (2000). How Philosophical Is Informal Logic? Informal Logic. 20(2): 139-167. 2000
 Charles Arthur Willard (1982). Argumentation and the Social Grounds of Knowledge. University of Alabama Press.
 Charles Arthur Willard (1989). A Theory of Argumentation. University of Alabama Press.
 Charles Arthur Willard (1996). Liberalism and the Problem of Knowledge: A New Rhetoric for Modern Democracy. University of Chicago Press.
 Harald Wohlrapp (2008). Der Begriff des Arguments. Über die Beziehungen zwischen Wissen, Forschen, Glaube, Subjektivität und Vernunft. Würzburg: Königshausen u. Neumann.

Flagship journals
 Argumentation
 Argumentation in Context
 Informal Logic
 Argumentation and Advocacy (formerly Journal of the American Forensic Association)
 Social Epistemology
 Episteme: A Journal of Social Epistemology
 Journal of Argument and Computation

Debating
Arguments
Logic
Legal reasoning
Social epistemology